Guillermo Segundo Venegas Lloveras (Quebradillas, Puerto Rico October 12, 1915 – San Juan, Puerto Rico July 23, 1993) was a Puerto Rican songwriter. After success in his youth with popular boleros, waltzes, tangos, marches, and danzas, in later life he returned to classical music. A two-hour television programme was produced by Puerto Rico Lyric Theatre director Jesús Quiñones Ledesma (otherwise known by stage name as the operatic tenor Ricardo Ledesma). After his death the rights to his songs were disputed.

Works
Génesis (Lucecita Benítez song) 1969

References

1915 births
1993 deaths
American male songwriters
People from Quebradillas, Puerto Rico
20th-century American composers
20th-century American male musicians